Tripler Army Medical Center (TAMC) is a major United States Department of Defense medical facility administered by the United States Army in the state of Hawaii. It is the tertiary care hospital in the Pacific Rim, serving local active and retired military personnel along with residents of nine U.S. jurisdictions and forces deployed in more than 40 other countries in the region. Located on the slopes of Moanalua Ridge overlooking the Honolulu neighborhoods of Moanalua and Salt Lake, Tripler Army Medical Center's massive coral pink structure can be seen from any point in the Honolulu District. It also serves as headquarters of the Regional Health Command - Pacific.The main hospital facility is within the Honolulu census-designated place.

History
Tripler Hospital was established in 1907, housed in several wooden structures within Fort Shafter on the island of Oahu.  In 1920 it was named after a legendary American Civil War medic, Brevet Brigadier General Charles Stuart Tripler (1806–1866), who made significant contributions to the development of military medicine.

Tripler Army Medical Center was commissioned by Lt. General Robert C. Richardson Jr., who was Military Governor of the Territory of Hawaii during World War II. General Richardson hired the New York City based architectural firm of York & Sawyer to design the medical complex. The local landscape architect Robert O. Thompson designed the landscape to be "one of the great beauty spots of Hawaii", although his plans were never fully realized.

At the outbreak of World War II, Tripler Army Medical Center had a 450-bed capacity which then expanded to 1,000 beds through the addition of barracks-type buildings. Plans for the new Tripler Army Medical Center on Moanalua Ridge were drawn in 1942 and construction was completed in 1948. The original hospital was demolished in 1959 to make way for expansion of Moanalua Road (now Interstate H-201).

See also
List of hospitals in Hawaii

References

External links 
 

United States Army medical installations
Military hospitals in the United States
Hospitals in Hawaii
Hospitals established in 1907
Government buildings completed in 1948
Hospital buildings completed in 1948
Installations of the United States Army in Hawaii
Buildings and structures in Honolulu
1907 establishments in Hawaii
1940s architecture in the United States
Hawaiian architecture
Trauma centers